The 2011 UK Music Video Awards were held on 8 November 2011 at the Odeon West End in Leicester Square, London to recognise the best in music videos and music film making from United Kingdom and worldwide. The nominations were announced on 12 October 2011. American indie rock band Manchester Orchestra won Video of the Year for "Simple Math" directed by Daniels.

Video of the Year

Special Awards

Video Genre Categories

Craft and Technical Categories

Individual and Company Categories

References

External links
Official website

UK Music Video Awards
UK Music Video Awards
UK Music Video Awards